WBSF (channel 46), branded on-air as CW 46, is a television station licensed to Bay City, Michigan, United States, serving northeastern Michigan as an affiliate of The CW. It is owned by Cunningham Broadcasting, which maintains a shared services agreement (SSA) with Sinclair Broadcast Group, owner of Flint-licensed Fox affiliate WSMH (channel 66), for the provision of certain services. Sinclair also operates Saginaw-licensed NBC affiliate WEYI-TV (channel 25) under a separate SSA with owner Howard Stirk Holdings.

The three stations share studios on West Pierson Road in Mount Morris Township (with a Flint mailing address); WBSF's transmitter is located at its former studios on West Willard Road in Vienna Township along the Genesee–Saginaw county line (with a Clio mailing address).

History
A permit was issued by the FCC for a new station on channel 46 in Bay City to Vista Communications Group in late 2003. The station was expected to be the WB network affiliate for the Flint/Tri-Cities market.

On October 1, 2004, the station's construction permit was approved. In that same year, Barrington launched WBSF on cable and on WEYI's second digital subchannel.  On February 2, 2005, the FCC transferred the permit to Acme Television then to Barrington Broadcasting.

With the merger of The WB and UPN to become The CW, WBSF became the area's network affiliate in September 2006 when the channel began broadcasting over the air. Because of this, a chance existed that WKBD (which along with WBKP are the only other over-the-air CW affiliates in Michigan) would be dropped from this market's cable systems as both WBSF and WKBD would be CW affiliates. However, in the case of Midland, two CBS affiliates do coexist on the same cable system. This occurred on Charter's Tri-Cities systems which replaced WKBD with MyNetworkTV affiliate WNEM-DT2 that became the new home of Pistons basketball that year. As a result of the network change, WBSF rebranded from "Mid-Michigan's WB" to "CW 46 Mid-Michigan". However, its call letters were not changed as the "B" in the calls also stands for Bay City which is the station's city of license. "S" and "F" stand for Saginaw and Flint, respectively. WBSF signed-on its analog channel on September 13, 2006 although it continues to be seen on WEYI-DT2.  As such, it is the only full-power television station to be built and signed-on by Barrington Broadcasting although Barrington acquired its construction permit from ACME Communications before construction began.

On February 28, 2013, Barrington announced that it would sell its entire group, including WBSF and WEYI, to Sinclair Broadcast Group. However, due to FCC duopoly regulations, since Sinclair already owns Fox affiliate WSMH, Sinclair will transfer the license assets of WBSF to Cunningham Broadcasting and of WEYI to Howard Stirk Holdings (owned by conservative talk show host Armstrong Williams). WSMH will take over the operations of both WBSF and WEYI through local marketing agreements when the deal is completed. The sale was completed on November 25.

Programming
Syndicated programming on WBSF includes Divorce Court, Maury, Dateline, Black-ish, and Family Guy, among others.

WBSF has served as an alternate NBC affiliate. In 2006, the channel aired an episode of Friday Night Lights (also on tape delay) due to WEYI's broadcast of the second Michigan gubernatorial debate. The station may air any preempted NBC program should the preemption occur on WEYI for a local special, breaking news story, any other emergency, or beginning in August 2017, Detroit Lions preseason football.

Newscasts
WBSF once aired a weeknight newscast called The 7 O'Clock News on CW 46 which was produced by WEYI. This production was canceled in April 2008. The station, being operated by Sinclair and a CW affiliate, may carry sports from Sinclair Networks' Stadium as it was slated for its CW or My Network TV affiliated stations.

Technical information

Subchannels
The station's ATSC 1.0 channels are carried on the multiplexed digital signals of other Flint/Saginaw television stations:

Analog-to-digital conversion
In June 2008, WBSF received its Construction permit for its digital facilities with the station switching from analog to digital broadcasting on June 12, 2009.

ATSC 3.0 conversion
The station began broadcasting in ATSC 3.0 on March 15, 2022, carrying the signal of that station along with WJRT-TV, WNEM, WSMH, and WEYI-TV.

References

External links

The CW affiliates
Charge! (TV network) affiliates
Sinclair Broadcast Group
Television channels and stations established in 2004
BSF
2004 establishments in Michigan
ATSC 3.0 television stations